Live at Brixton may refer to:

 Live at Brixton (DMA's album), 2021
 Live at Brixton (Mastodon album), 2014
 Live at Brixton (Of Mice & Men album), 2016
 Live at Brixton by Public Service Broadcasting, 2016

See also
 
 Live at Brixton Academy (disambiguation)